1. Wiener Neustädter SC was an Austrian association football club. They qualified once for the UEFA Cup Winners' Cup, by reaching the Austrian Cup Final in 1965.

European cup history

Honours
Austrian Cup
Finalist (1x): 1964/65
Austrian Second Division
Champions (4x):	1945/46, 1949/50, 1958/59, 1962/63
Runners-up (6x): 1937/38, 1938/39, 1941/42, 1946/47, 1973/74, 1975/76
Third place (4x): 1947/48, 1951/52, 1955/56, 1976/77
Austrian Regionalliga East:
Champions (1x): 1992/93
Runners-up (2x): 1985/86, 1991/92
Austrian Amateur Championships:
Champions (1x): 1935/36
Lower Austrian Championships:
Champions (8x): 1923, 1924, 1925, 1926, 1936, 1937, 1946, 1950

References

 
Defunct football clubs in Austria
Sport in Lower Austria